Elizabeth Blackmar is an American historian, author, and professor who specializes in the social history of the American economy and infrastructure. Blackmar is known for her book The Park and the People: A History of Central Park co-written with Roy Rosenzweig. She is the Mary and David Boies Professor of American History at Columbia University.

Early life and education 
Blackmar received a B.A. from Smith College in 1972 and a Ph.D. from Harvard University in 1981.

Career 
Blackmar specializes in urban and social history. In 2012–2013, Blackmar was a fellow at the Cullman Center.

Bibliography 
 The Park and the People: A History of Central Park - 1989
 Manhattan for Rent, 1785-1850 - 1992

References 

20th-century American historians
Living people
Columbia University faculty
Smith College alumni
Harvard University alumni
21st-century American historians
Year of birth missing (living people)